Margrit Schiller (born March 1948) is a German far-left activist formerly associated with the Socialist Patients' Collective and later the Red Army Faction.

Early life
Schiller was born in Bonn, North Rhine-Westphalia in March 1948. She studied psychology in Bonn and Heidelberg and became a student member of the Socialist Patients' Collective (SPK) and was one of the members who turned militant in 1970. After the SPK dissolved Schiller joined the Red Army Faction.

Militant leftist career
On September 25, 1971, two policemen approached a wrongly parked vehicle on the Freiburg-Basel autobahn. However, before they reached the vehicle, two people jumped out and started firing guns at them. Both policemen were shot albeit only one was seriously injured. The policemen later identified Schiller and Holger Meins as their assailants.

On October 22 of the same year, Schiller left a Hamburg train station around 10pm and realising she was being trailed by police she hid in a car park but the police were still tracking her. She ran into her comrades Irmgard Moeller and Gerhard Müller and when the police tried to approach her she ran, followed by the police, Moeller and Müller. One of the police men caught Schiller but there was a scuffle and he was shot six times and killed, the other police man was shot in the foot.

Schiller later claimed that it was Müller that was responsible for the murder. Later that night around 2am, police approached a female suspect in a telephone booth who turned out to be Schiller. When she came out the police drew their weapons; “Oh, and I thought you wanted to fuck me!” Schiller exclaimed. When they searched her they found a 9 mm pistol in her handbag. She was arrested and sentenced to 27 months in prison.

Schiller was released in 1973 and went underground straight away. She was involved in the reorganised RAF following the arrests of leading members Ulrike Meinhof and Andreas Baader. During this time she took part in bank robberies. However, in January/February 1974 she was re-arrested after police carried out raids in Hamburg and Frankfurt. Whilst in prison Schiller took part, unsuccessfully, in some hunger strikes.

Later life
In 1979 Schiller was released from prison. She moved to Cuba in 1985. Then she left Havana and went to Uruguay in 1993. Aften ten years in Montevideo she returned in Germany. She is now living in Berlin. She described her experience in Cuba and Uruguay in a memoir "So siehst du gar nicht aus!" (2011).

References

Sources
 Book: Hitler's Children by Jillian Becker
 Book: Remembering the Armed Struggle: Life in Baader-Meinhof by Margrit Schiller (autobiography)

1948 births
Living people
People from Bonn
20th-century German criminals
People imprisoned on charges of terrorism
German prisoners and detainees
Prisoners and detainees of Germany
Members of the Socialist Patients' Collective
Members of the Red Army Faction
Criminals from North Rhine-Westphalia